Buchema tainoa is a species of sea snail, a marine gastropod mollusk in the family Horaiclavidae.

It was formerly included within the family Turridae.

Description
The length of the shell attains 14.2 mm, its diameter 5.9 mm.

Distribution
This marine species occurs off Puerto Rico.

References

 Corea, Lois Fleming. "New marine mollusks (with three plates)." (1934)
 Bartsch, P. (1934) Reports on the collections obtained by the first Johnson-Smithsonian deep-sea expedition to the Puerto Rican deep; new mollusks of the family Turritidae. Smithsonian Miscellaneous Collections, 91, 1–29, 8 pls

External links
  Tucker, J.K. 2004 Catalog of recent and fossil turrids (Mollusca: Gastropoda). Zootaxa 682:1–1295.

tainoa
Gastropods described in 1934